State Route 223 (SR 223) is a state highway in Elko County, Nevada, United States. Co-signed with Interstate 80 Business (I-80 Bus.), it serves the town of Wells.

Route description

State Route 223 begins at the intersection of Humboldt Avenue and Angel Lake Road (SR 231) in western Wells. From there, the highway follows Humboldt Avenue northward, crossing underneath Interstate 80 (I-80), curving easterly as the road borders residential areas of the town. SR 223 turns southeasterly to follow Sixth Street for about  before reaching its terminus at the intersection with U.S. Route 93.

Sixth Street continues east to intersect a westbound off ramp from I-80, which completes the I-80 Bus. Loop.

History
Prior to 1976, the portion of SR 223 along Sixth Street was part of old State Route 1 and U.S. Route 40.

Major intersections

See also

References

223
Transportation in Elko County, Nevada